Herd behavior is the behavior of individuals in a group acting collectively without centralized direction. Herd behavior occurs in animals in herds, packs, bird flocks, fish schools and so on, as well as in humans. Voting, demonstrations, riots, general strikes, sporting events, religious gatherings, everyday decision-making, judgement and opinion-forming, are all forms of human-based herd behavior.

Raafat, Chater and Frith proposed an integrated approach to herding, describing two key issues, the mechanisms of transmission of thoughts or behavior between individuals and the patterns of connections between them.  They suggested that bringing together diverse theoretical approaches of herding behavior illuminates the applicability of the concept to many domains, ranging from cognitive neuroscience to economics.

Animal behavior

A group of animals fleeing from a predator shows the nature of herd behavior, for example in 1971, in the oft cited article "Geometry For The Selfish Herd", evolutionary biologist W. D. Hamilton asserted that each individual group member reduces the danger to itself by moving as close as possible to the center of the fleeing group. Thus the herd appears as a unit in moving together, but its function emerges from the uncoordinated behavior of self-serving individuals.

Symmetry-breaking
Asymmetric aggregation of animals under panic conditions has been observed in many species, including humans, mice, and ants. Theoretical models have demonstrated symmetry-breaking similar to observations in empirical studies. For example, when panicked individuals are confined to a room with two equal and equidistant exits, a majority will favor one exit while the minority will favor the other.

Possible mechanisms for this behavior include Hamilton’s selfish herd theory, neighbor copying, or the byproduct of communication by social animals or runaway positive feedback.

Characteristics of escape panic include:

 Individuals attempt to move faster than normal.
 Interactions between individuals become physical.
 Exits become arched and clogged.
 Escape is slowed by fallen individuals serving as obstacles.
 Individuals display a tendency towards mass or copied behavior.
 Alternative or less used exits are overlooked.

Human behavior

Early research 
The philosophers Søren Kierkegaard and Friedrich Nietzsche were among the first to criticize what they referred to as "the crowd" (Kierkegaard) and "herd morality" and the "herd instinct" (Nietzsche) in human society. Modern psychological and economic research has identified herd behavior in humans to explain the phenomenon of large numbers of people acting in the same way at the same time. The British surgeon Wilfred Trotter popularized the "herd behavior" phrase in his book, Instincts of the Herd in Peace and War (1914). In The Theory of the Leisure Class, Thorstein Veblen explained economic behavior in terms of social influences such as "emulation," where some members of a group mimic other members of higher status. In "The Metropolis and Mental Life" (1903), early sociologist George Simmel referred to the "impulse to sociability in man", and sought to describe "the forms of association by which a mere sum of separate individuals are made into a 'society' ". Other social scientists explored behaviors related to herding, such as Sigmund Freud (crowd psychology), Carl Jung (collective unconscious), Everett Dean Martin (Behavior of Crowds) and Gustave Le Bon (the popular mind).

Swarm theory observed in non-human societies is a related concept and is being explored as it occurs in human society. Scottish journalist Charles Mackay identifies multiple facets of herd behaviour in his 1841 work, Extraordinary Popular Delusions and the Madness of Crowds.

Everyday decision-making
"Benign" herding behaviors may occur frequently in everyday decisions based on learning from the information of others, as when a person on the street decides which of two restaurants to dine in. Suppose that both look appealing, but both are empty because it is early evening; so at random, this person chooses restaurant A. Soon a couple walks down the same street in search of a place to eat. They see that restaurant A has customers while B is empty, and choose A on the assumption that having customers makes it the better choice. Because other passersby do the same thing into the evening, restaurant A does more business that night than B. This phenomenon is also referred as an information cascade.

Crowds

Crowds that gather on behalf of a grievance can involve herding behavior that turns violent, particularly when confronted by an opposing ethnic or racial group. The Los Angeles riots of 1992, New York Draft Riots and Tulsa Race Riot are notorious in U.S. history. The idea of a "group mind" or "mob behavior" was put forward by the French social psychologists Gabriel Tarde and Gustave Le Bon.

Sheeple
Sheeple (a portmanteau of "sheep" and "people") is a derogatory term that highlights the passive herd behavior of people easily controlled by a governing power or market fads which likens them to sheep, a herd animal that is "easily" led about. The term is used to describe those who voluntarily acquiesce to a suggestion without any significant critical analysis or research, in large part due to the majority of a population having a similar mindset. Word Spy defines it as "people who are meek, easily persuaded, and tend to follow the crowd (sheep + people)". Merriam-Webster defines the term as "people who are docile, compliant, or easily influenced: people likened to sheep". The word is pluralia tantum, which means it does not have a singular form.

While its origins are unclear, the word was used by W. R. Anderson in his column Round About Radio, published in London 1945, where he wrote:The simple truth is that you can get away with anything, in government. That covers almost all the evils of the time. Once in, nobody, apparently, can turn you out. The People, as ever (I spell it "Sheeple"), will stand anything.Another early use was from Ernest Rogers, whose 1949 book The Old Hokum Bucket contained a chapter entitled "We the Sheeple". The Wall Street Journal first reported the label in print in 1984; the reporter heard the word used by the proprietor of the American Opinion bookstore. In this usage, taxpayers were derided for their blind conformity as opposed to those who thought independently. The term was first popularized in the late 1980s and early 1990s by conspiracy theorist and broadcaster Bill Cooper on his radio program The Hour of the Time which was broadcast internationally via shortwave radio stations. The program gained a small, yet dedicated following, inspiring many individuals who would later broadcast their own radio programs critical of the United States government. This then led to its regular use on the radio program Coast to Coast AM by Art Bell throughout the 1990s and early 2000s. These combined factors significantly increased the popularity of the word and led to its widespread use.

The term can also be used for those who seem inordinately tolerant, or welcoming, of widespread policies. In a column entitled "A Nation of Sheeple", columnist Walter E. Williams writes, "Americans sheepishly accepted all sorts of Transportation Security Administration nonsense. In the name of security, we've allowed fingernail clippers, eyeglass screwdrivers, and toy soldiers to be taken from us prior to boarding a plane."

Economics and finance

Currency crises

Currency crises tend to display herding behavior when foreign and domestic investors convert a government's currency into physical assets (like gold) or foreign currencies when they realize the government is unable to repay its debts. This is called a speculative attack and it will tend to cause moderate inflation in the short term. When consumers realize that the inflation of needed commodities is increasing, they will begin to stockpile and hoard goods, which will accelerate the rate of inflation even faster. This will ultimately crash the currency and likely lead to civil unrest.

Stock market bubbles
Large stock market trends often begin and end with periods of frenzied buying (bubbles) or selling (crashes). Many observers cite these episodes as clear examples of herding behavior that is irrational and driven by emotion—greed in the bubbles, fear in the crashes. Individual investors join the crowd of others in a rush to get in or out of the market.

Some followers of the technical analysis school of investing see the herding behavior of investors as an example of extreme market sentiment. The academic study of behavioral finance has identified herding in the collective irrationality of investors, particularly the work of Nobel laureates Vernon L. Smith, Amos Tversky, Daniel Kahneman, and Robert Shiller. Hey and Morone (2004) analyzed a model of herd behavior in a market context.

Some empirical works on methods for detecting and measuring the extent of herding include Christie and Huang (1995) and Chang, Cheng and Khorana (2000). These results refer to a market with a well-defined fundamental value. A notable incident of possible herding is the 2007 uranium bubble, which started with flooding of the Cigar Lake Mine in Saskatchewan, during the year 2006.

Economic theory of herding 
There are two strands of work in economic theory that consider why herding occurs and provide frameworks for examining its causes and consequences.

The first of these strands is that on herd behavior in a non-market context. The seminal references are Banerjee (1992) and Bikhchandani, Hirshleifer and Welch (1992), both of which showed that herd behavior may result from private information not publicly shared. More specifically, both of these papers showed that individuals, acting sequentially on the basis of private information and public knowledge about the behavior of others, may end up choosing the socially undesirable option. A large subsequent literature has examined the causes and consequences of such "herds" and information cascades.

The second strands concerns information aggregation in market contexts. A very early reference is the classic paper by Grossman and Stiglitz (1976) that showed that uninformed traders in a market context can become informed through the price in such a way that private information is aggregated correctly and efficiently. Subsequent work has shown that markets may systematically overweight public information; it has also studied the role of strategic trading as an obstacle to efficient information aggregation.

Marketing 
Herd behavior is often a useful tool in marketing and, if used properly, can lead to increases in sales and changes to the structure of society. Whilst it has been shown that financial incentives cause action in large numbers of people, herd mentality often wins out in a case of "Keeping up with the Joneses".

Brand and product success 
Communications technologies have contributed to the proliferation to consumer choice and "the power of crowds", Consumers increasingly have more access to opinions and information from both opinion leaders and formers on platforms that have largely user-generated content, and thus have more tools with which to complete any decision-making process. Popularity is seen as an indication of better quality, and consumers will use the opinions of others posted on these platforms as a powerful compass to guide them towards products and brands that align with their preconceptions and the decisions of others in their peer groups. Taking into account differences in needs and their position in the socialization process, Lessig & Park examined groups of students and housewives and the influence that these reference groups have on one another. By way of herd mentality, students tended to encourage each other towards beer, hamburger and cigarettes, whilst housewives tended to encourage each other towards furniture and detergent. Whilst this particular study was done in 1977, one cannot discount its findings in today's society. A study done by Burke, Leykin, Li and Zhang in 2014 on the social influence on shopper behavior shows that shoppers are influenced by direct interactions with companions, and as a group size grows, herd behaviour becomes more apparent. Discussions that create excitement and interest have greater impact on touch frequency and purchase likelihood grows with greater involvement caused by a large group. Shoppers in this Midwestern American shopping outlet were monitored and their purchases noted, and it was found up to a point, potential customers preferred to be in stores which had moderate levels of traffic. The other people in the store not only served as company, but also provided an inference point on which potential customers could model their behavior and make purchase decisions, as with any reference group or community.

Social media can also be a powerful tool in perpetuating herd behaviour. Its immeasurable amount of user-generated content serves as a platform for opinion leaders to take the stage and influence purchase decisions, and recommendations from peers and evidence of positive online experience all serve to help consumers make purchasing decisions. Gunawan and Huarng's 2015 study concluded that social influence is essential in framing attitudes towards brands, which in turn leads to purchase intention. Influencers form norms which their peers are found to follow, and targeting extroverted personalities increases chances of purchase even further. This is because the stronger personalities tend to be more engaged on consumer platforms and thus spread word of mouth information more efficiently. Many brands have begun to realise the importance of brand ambassadors and influencers, and it is being shown more clearly that herd behaviour can be used to drive sales and profits exponentially in favour of any brand through examination of these instances.

Social marketing 
Marketing can easily transcend beyond commercial roots, in that it can be used to encourage action to do with health, environmentalism and general society. Herd mentality often takes a front seat when it comes to social marketing, paving the way for campaigns such as Earth Day, and the variety of anti-smoking and anti-obesity campaigns seen in every country. Within cultures and communities, marketers must aim to influence opinion leaders who in turn influence each other, as it is the herd mentality of any group of people that ensures a social campaign's success. A campaign run by Som la Pera in Spain to combat teenage obesity found that campaigns run in schools are more effective due to influence of teachers and peers, and students' high visibility, and their interaction with one another. Opinion leaders in schools created the logo and branding for the campaign, built content for social media and led in-school presentations to engage audience interaction. It was thus concluded that the success of the campaign was rooted in the fact that its means of communication was the audience itself, giving the target audience a sense of ownership and empowerment. As mentioned previously, students exert a high level of influence over one another, and by encouraging stronger personalities to lead opinions, the organizers of the campaign were able to secure the attention of other students who identified with the reference group.

Herd behaviour not only applies to students in schools where they are highly visible, but also amongst communities where perceived action plays a strong role. Between 2003 and 2004, California State University carried out a study to measure household conservation of energy, and motivations for doing so. It was found that factors like saving the environment, saving money or social responsibility did not have as great an impact on each household as the perceived behaviour of their neighbours did. Although the financial incentives of saving money, closely followed by moral incentives of protecting the environment, are often thought of as being a community's greatest guiding compass, more households responded to the encouragement to save energy when they were told that 77% of their neighbours were using fans instead of air conditioning, proving that communities are more likely to engage in a behaviour if they think that everyone else is already taking part.

Herd behaviours shown in the two examples exemplify that it can be a powerful tool in social marketing, and if harnessed correctly, has the potential to achieve great change. It is clear that opinion leaders and their influence achieve huge reach among their reference groups and thus can be used as the loudest voices to encourage others in any collective direction.

See also

 and

Notes

a.  See for example the Wikipedia article on his book Irrational Exuberance.

References

Further reading

Martin, Everett Dean, The Behavior of Crowds, A Psychological Study, Harper & Brothers Publishers, New York, 1920.

 Ebsco. Fall. Keyword: Herd Behaviour.

External links

Behavioral finance
Crowd psychology
Group processes
Behavioral ecology
Articles containing video clips
Herding